Front by Front is an album by Front 242, released in 1988, and has been labelled as "easily one of the greatest industrial albums ever made". The album was reissued in 1992 by Sony Music Entertainment. The song "Headhunter" became an industrial dancefloor hit, accompanied by a music video directed by Anton Corbijn, and has since been subject to over 20 remixes.

Miss Kittin used "First In / First Out" on her mix album A Bugged Out Mix.

Track listing

Notes
The 1992 bonus tracks were originally released on the Never Stop! EP, except for "Headhunter v1.0" which was originally released on the Headhunter EP.

Reception
Front By Front was one of Wax Trax! Records most successful releases selling more than 90,000 units in its first run. The album, and its lead single "Headhunter," elevated the public awareness of EBM and industrial music in the late 1980s.

Personnel

Front 242
 Jean-Luc De Meyer – vocals
 Daniel Bressanutti – keyboards
 Patrick Codenys – keyboards
 Richard Jonckheere – drums

Additional personnel
 Frédéric Boebaert – art direction
 Greg Calbi – mastering, remastering
 Alain  Verbaert – photography

References

1988 albums
Front 242 albums
Wax Trax! Records albums
Red Rhino Records albums
Epic Records albums